Qatar participated in the 2014 Asian Games in Incheon, South Korea from 19 September to 4 October 2014.

Medal summary

Medal table

Medalists

References

Nations at the 2014 Asian Games
2014
Asian Games